The Infiniti QX70, formerly called the Infiniti FX until 2013, is a mid-size luxury crossover SUV produced by the Nissan-owned Infiniti luxury vehicle brand between 2002 and 2017. The FX replaced the QX4 as Infiniti's mid-size SUV. It shares the same FM platform as the rear-wheel drive Nissan 370Z, and it "made no claims of climbing mountains." Rather, its aggressive shape promised style and quick handling. The similarly sized Nissan Murano is based on the same D platform as the front-wheel drive Nissan Altima. The FX does not have a Nissan-branded equivalent and is not sold in Japan.

The FX introduced its second generation for the 2009 model year as the FX35 and FX50.

First generation (S50; 2003)

The nameplates FX35 and FX45 refer to the two available engines. The FX35 is available in two drivetrains, the RWD and the AWD, which are both fitted to a dual overhead cam 3.5-liter 24-valve V6 VQ35DE gasoline engine, with aluminum-alloy block and heads, electronically controlled throttle system, and low-friction molybdenum-coated pistons that makes use of the continuous variable valve timing which in part optimizes the opening of intake valves.  This is also coupled with an electronically controlled super-wide ratio five-speed automatic with a manumatic shift mode that includes the option of sequentially selected manual gearshifts and downshift rev-matching.

The AWD FX45 incorporates a  32-valve V8 DOHC VK45DE gasoline engine with four valves per cylinder, microfinished camshafts with aluminum-alloy block and heads, low-friction molybdenum-coated pistons, titanium intake and exhaust valves, modular cylinder heads, microfinished crankshaft, lightweight pistons, super-silent single stage cam drive chain, and a Continuously Variable Valve Timing Control System that optimizes opening of intake valves. Development began in 1999 under newly appointed CEO Carlos Ghosn's NRP. Design work was completed in rapid succession in 2000, for late 2002 production. Designed prior to that, earlier on in 2000 under the "Bionic Cheetah" theme, the 2001 Infiniti FX45 Concept was introduced at the NAIAS in January 2001. From mid-2001, a new concept based on the production design was developed and completed in late 2001. Sketches were first released in late November 2001. The second-generation 2002 FX45 Concept was introduced in January 2002 at the NAIAS '02 as a thinly-veiled production FX (S50) and planned production was announced for early 2003. In January 2003, the 2003 FX45 made its debut at the 2003 NAIAS and went on sale January 24, 2003.

In 2003 for the 2004 model, changes were the addition of a standard eight-way power front passenger seat that replaced the previous four-way design, the availability of aluminum roof rails and chrome-plated 20-inch wheels. Also new were a dark silver metallic finish for the 20-inch wheels (non-chrome-plated), the addition of a standard HVAC filter for all models and the addition of a new Snow-Mode function.

In September 2004 for the 2005 model year, the FX range received enhancements such as a lane departure warning (LDW) system that helps alert drivers to an unintended movement of the vehicle out of a designated traffic lane. Infiniti's system monitored the lane markings to alert passengers via an audible buzzer that the driver is drifting unintentionally. The LDW system, which utilizes a small camera, speed sensor, an indicator, and an audible warning buzzer, was offered on models. The 2005 Infiniti FX was the first passenger vehicle to offer a lane departure warning system in the United States market. 
In addition to LDW, the 2005 Infiniti FX range was now equipped with standard roof-mounted curtain supplemental curtain airbags with rollover protection for front and rear outboard seat occupants.

Other changes included the addition of a dark chrome grille, headlight, and clear taillight accents to the FX45 (also available as part of the V6 Sport Package on FX35 models), a new key fob design for the Infiniti Intelligent Key system, and two new exterior colors, Sapphire and Sheer Platinum. Interior changes included a new standard etched aluminum trim.

Total 2007 sales of the FX45 were 1,598 units, about a tenth of the FX35s.

2006 facelift

The FX series was updated for the 2006 model year with new options and standard features. The updates included an exterior facelift with a new grille, bumper, wheel design, and three new exterior colors, and inside a revised center console with a new color screen. Many features previously optional were made standard, including the 300-watt Bose audio system, RearView Monitor, 7-inch color display, Advanced Air Bag System (AABS), leather seating surfaces with heated front seats, ten-way power driver's seat with power lumbar support and eight-way power passenger's seat.

The FX45 featured additional upgrades, including new 20-inch wheels, leather-appointed seats, a revised sport-tuned four-wheel independent suspension with new dampers, a Bluetooth system, and the Premium Package became standard. Sales began in January 2006, after production commencement in November 2005. Production of the S50 ended in February 2008.

Performance
FX35: 
0-: 7.1 seconds
0-: 17.5
1/4 mile: 15.3 seconds at 
 Skidpad: .79 g
Top speed:  (drag limited)

FX45: 
0-: 6.1 seconds
0-: 16.5 seconds
1/4 mile: 14.6 seconds at 
 Skidpad: .82 g
Top speed:  (electronically limited)

Second generation (S51; 2008)

Initial release

FX35, FX50

The redesigned 2009 Infiniti FX was officially unveiled at the Geneva Motor Show on March 4, 2008, and went on sale in June 2008. The V6 model was still called FX35 with the VQ35HR V6, but the V8 model was renamed FX50 in recognition of its 5-liter engine, the newly developed VK50VE.

The exterior retained some of the first generation's "Bionic Cheetah" look and "giant scarab" profile while incorporating new styling cues. Features of the new design included longer, shark-like sculpted headlights, a large trapezoidal grille filled with horizontal dark-chrome waves, and functional side air vents. The overall size and dimensions of the new model, both external and internal, remained similar to the previous model.

The interior was completely redesigned to bring the FX up to the level of luxury found inside of other Infiniti models like the G37 and EX35.  Features included stitched leather seats, stained maple wood or piano black finishes, and matte-finish surfaces.

Front suspension was a new double-wishbone design, similar to that found on the G37 and EX35; this replaced the previous generation FX's front strut-type suspension. The suspension's upper and lower A-arms were designed to improve control of a wheel's motion, especially when the suspension compresses and extends, providing more travel than the previous strut design. The body was also designed to be 1.6 times more torsionally rigid and 3.4 times more resistant to bending than the previous model. All Wheel Drive (AWD) was standard, and notably, Infiniti's AWD system always engages a 50:50 power split when stationary, ensuring maximum off-the-line traction at all times. Up to 100 percent of the engine's power can be sent to the rear wheels when needed, with a maximum of 50 percent available to the front.

FX37 (Europe)
A Europe-specific FX37 was unveiled at the 2008 Paris Motor Show and went on sale in Europe in October 2008 with the VQ37VHR. Europeans get the  FX37 as their entry-level model instead of the FX35, which will be available in FX37 GT and FX37S versions. The FX37 GT came equipped with 20-inch alloy wheels, power and heated/ventilated front seats, adaptive xenon headlamps, parking camera sensors, all-wheel-drive, and a 7-speed automatic with paddle shifting. The FX37S added 21-inch alloy wheels, Continuous Damping Control, and sports seats.

FX30d turbo diesel (Europe)
A Europe-specific FX30d was released in late 2010, powered by a new 3.0-liter V6 turbodiesel V9X Engine.  The engine was developed by the Renault-Nissan Alliance, and will also power the EX and M models.

This engine, which is the first diesel in Infiniti's history, was specifically designed to deliver high levels of refined performance in line with Infiniti philosophy.  Although a V8 diesel engine was entertained, the V6 format was selected early on as the ideal layout for the unit, providing the optimum balance between overall performance and refinement.

Idle speed is an exceptionally low 650 rpm with none of the noise, vibration, and harshness (NVH) usually associated with a diesel.

Equipment
Standard comfort features include dual-zone automatic climate control, a premium 11-speaker, 300 watt Bose stereo with in-dash 6 CD changer and 2GB hard drive, steering wheel mounted audio controls, premium leather seating surfaces, heated front bucket seats, heated power mirrors, 10-way power driver seat w/ lumbar adjustment, 8-way power passenger seat, individual driver memory system (driver's seat, side mirrors, and steering wheel positions), RearView back-up camera, UV reflective glass, and Infiniti's Intelligent Key system.  The Intelligent Key design from the first generation FX now incorporates a Push Button Ignition system.  With this system, the driver does not have to remove keys to drive the vehicle; a simple electronic fob carried on the driver allows the driver to lock/unlock and start the vehicle keyless.

Other standard features include Scratch Shield paint (first introduced on the Infiniti EX), black lacquer interior trim, high-intensity discharge (HID) headlamps, LED brake lamps, 12-point sequential welcome lighting, electronic liftgate closure assist, automatic dimming rear-view mirror with compass, glass moonroof, rear privacy glass, integrated rear spoiler, and dual chrome exhaust tips.

Standard safety features include dual front airbags, side-impact airbags, and rear curtain airbags with rollover sensors, as well as Zone Body construction with front and rear crumple zones.

Options include Infiniti's Hard Drive Navigation with touch screen and 3D building images, All-Around View Monitor (first introduced on the Infiniti EX) which displays a virtual bird's-eye view of the vehicle and surroundings to aid in parking, and Intelligent Cruise Control, which provides the benefits of standard cruise control with the ability to add speed and distance intervals, as well as automatically slowing the vehicle in slowing traffic to help provide a safe distance.  When traffic flow ahead speeds up, Intelligent Cruise Control then reaccelerates to the preset speed and distance settings.  Optional industry-first Distance Control Assist intuitively helps the driver release the throttle and apply the brakes as needed in slowing traffic.  Another option, Forward Collision Warning uses the Intelligent Cruise system's laser rangefinder to alert the driver of a potential collision, and if the driver does not respond, Brake Assist automatically engages the brakes to help reduce collision speed and impact. The Premium Package adds heated and cooled front seats, a power-adjustable steering wheel, iPod integration system, folding outdoor mirrors, and aluminum paddle shifters to adjust the gears when using the manual shift mode.

Transmission and drivetrain
All 2009 FX models came standard with Infiniti's new 7-speed automatic transmission, which was also introduced on the 2009 G37 coupe.

The FX35 (U.S.) is available in both rear-wheel drive or all-wheel drive configuration, while the FX35 (Canada), FX37 (Europe), and FX50 (all) come standard with all-wheel drive. The FX uses Nissan's ATTESA E-TS all-wheel drive system.

All FX50 models ordered with the Sport package (FX50S) come equipped with Active Steering package. This package features a planetary gearset on the steering shaft (similar to BMW), that varies the steering ratio between 12.0:1 and 18.5:1. The package also includes a rear-wheel steering system that induces up to one degree of steer to the rear wheels, to provide increased handling response for the vehicle.

2011 update

2012 Infiniti FX, Limited Edition (2011-2017)

Changes to the Infiniti FX include a redesigned front grille and front fascia design, revised meter illumination, standard heated front seats on all models, a new exterior color, Graphite Shadow (replaces Platinum Graphite), a new 20-inch wheel design for the FX35 Deluxe Touring Package, the addition of Adaptive Front-lighting System (AFS) to the FX50 Sport Package, a shift of the quilted leather climate-controlled front seats to the FX35 Deluxe Touring Package from the Premium Package.

The Limited Edition is based on the FX35 AWD, with exclusive Iridium Blue body color, 21-inch 10-spoke dark finish aluminum-alloy turbine wheels, Infiniti Hard Drive Navigation System, Around View Monitor, dark tinted adaptive headlamps, and dark tinted side air vents, and lower door trim.

US models went on sale in October 2011. Early models included FX35, FX35 AWD, FX50 AWD.

Sebastian Vettel Edition concept (2011)

The vehicle was unveiled in the 2011 Frankfurt Motor Show by Formula 1 driver Sebastian Vettel.

Sebastian Vettel Edition (2012-2013)

It is a limited (150 units (50 in Western Europe)) version of the Infiniti FX50 based on the Sebastian Vettel Edition concept, with Moonlight White body color.

The vehicle was unveiled in the 2012 Geneva Motor Show.

UK models went on sale for £100,800, with a carbon rear spoiler available at an extra cost.

Engines

Performance
FX35:
0-: 6.1 seconds
0-: 15.7
1/4 mile: 14.9 seconds at 
 Skidpad: .82g
Top Speed:  (governed limited)

FX37 (Europe):
0-: 5.8 seconds
1/4 mile: 14.6 seconds at 
Top Speed:  (drag limited)

FX50:
0-: 4.8 seconds
0-: 12.6 seconds
1/4 mile: 13.7 seconds at 
 Skidpad: .87g
Top Speed:  (electronically limited)

Production
All vehicles are built at Nissan Motor Company's plant in Tochigi, Japan.
From 2013, also built at Nissan Motor Company's plant in Shushari, Saint-Petersburg, Russia until 2014.

Infiniti QX70 (S51, 2013-2017)

Initial release

2014 QX70 (2013-2017)
Changes to the Infiniti FX include the removal of the Limited Edition model.

The vehicle was unveiled in the 2013 Geneva Motor Show.

US models went on sale in June 2013 as 2014 model year vehicles. Early models included QX70 5.0 AWD, QX70 3.7 AWD and QX70 3.7. 5.0 AWD was last offered in the U.S. in the 2014 model year.

Engines

Transmissions

Production
In August 2013, total of 3,026 QX70 vehicles were delivered, for total of 20,556 vehicles.

Marketing
Three QX70 vehicles were used in the Riyadh campaign titled 'Inspired Light by Infiniti'.

2017 model year update

2017 QX70, QX70 Limited (2016-2017)
The QX70 Limited was unveiled at the 2016 New York International Auto Show.

US models of QX70 Limited went on sale in summer 2016, followed by QX70 3.7, QX70 3.7 AWD.

Engines

Transmissions

Discontinuation
In July 2017, the US-market QX70 would not be offered in the 2018 model year due to poor sales and the company's focus to the better-selling QX50.

References

External links
 Official Infiniti USA QX70 homepage

QX70
Cars introduced in 2003
2010s cars
Mid-size sport utility vehicles
Luxury crossover sport utility vehicles
Rear-wheel-drive vehicles
All-wheel-drive vehicles